Cigaritis bergeri is a butterfly in the family Lycaenidae. It is found in the Democratic Republic of the Congo (Kasai and Katanga).

References

Butterflies described in 2003
Cigaritis
Endemic fauna of the Democratic Republic of the Congo